Phaeochorella is a genus of fungi It was formerly placed in the family Phyllachoraceae, before in 2020 placed in the monotypic family of Phaeochorellaceae.

Species
As accepted by Species Fungorum;
Phaeochorella artocarpi 
Phaeochorella ciliata 
Phaeochorella clypeata 
Phaeochorella machaerii 
Phaeochorella parinarii 
Phaeochorella zonata 

Former species; P. sphaerospora  = Phyllachora conica

References

External links
Index Fungorum

Sordariomycetes genera
Phyllachorales